Khon Kaen Football Club (Thai: สโมสรฟุตบอลจังหวัดขอนแก่น) is a Thailand professional football club, based in Khon Kaen province, a city located in the heart of the North Eastern Region of Thailand. The club currently plays in Thai League 3. In 2011, they achieved promotion from Thai Division 1 League to the Thai League 1 for the first time in their history, by finishing runners-up in the Thai Division 1 League.

Khonkaen play their home games at the Khon Kaen Provincial Administrative Organization Stadium. They traditionally play in black and yellow, and their nickname is commonly known as The T-Rexs which came from the famous rich dinosaur fossil excavations of the province.

History
Khon Kaen Football Club was publicly formed on 21 June 2007, before that time the club played in the Provincial League which largely consist of regional football clubs, nonetheless, the league was not recognized by the Football Association of Thailand.

In 2007 the league was merged into Thai Premier League and Thai Division 1 League and the club was registered to be professional football club in this year and was allocated into Thai Division 1 League Group A, the club was close to promotion by finishing at the fourth place that season.

In the 2008 season, Khon Kaen was not performing as well as the previous season as they could only finish the season in 8th place, nevertheless, the club proved themselves, being one of the favourites for promotion in the 2009 season, however, they lost the promotion spot to Sisaket in the last week of the season.

In 2010, the club was finally promoted to the Thai Premier League after finishing runners-up in the league table which was the first time for the club to participate in the top flight of Thai football.

However, their brief TPL tenure ended disappointingly as they finished bottom of the table. Any thoughts of yo-yoing straight back never emerged in 2012 with the T-Rex finishing in the bottom half of the first division.

In 2014, the Club got 17th of 2014 and relegated to 2015 Thai Division 2 League North Eastern Region into North-Eastern zone.

Stadium and locations

Season by season record

P = Played
W = Games won
D = Games drawn
L = Games lost
F = Goals for
A = Goals against
Pts = Points
Pos = Final position

TPL = Thai Premier League

QR1 = First Qualifying Round
QR2 = Second Qualifying Round
QR3 = Third Qualifying Round
QR4 = Fourth Qualifying Round
RInt = Intermediate Round
R1 = Round 1
R2 = Round 2
R3 = Round 3

R4 = Round 4
R5 = Round 5
R6 = Round 6
GR = Group stage
QF = Quarter-finals
SF = Semi-finals
RU = Runners-up
S = Shared
W = Winners

Players

First Team squad

Out on loan

Note: The official club website lists the supporters as player #12.

Coaching staff

Honours

Domestic leagues
 Thai League 3
 Runners-up (1): 2017
 Thai League 3 Upper Region
 Champions (1): 2017
 Thai Division 1 League
 Runners-up (1): 2010

Affiliated clubs
 Hokkaido Consadole Sapporo

References

External links
 Khon Kaen Football Club – Official website

 
Khon Kaen province
Football clubs in Thailand
Association football clubs established in 2007
2007 establishments in Thailand